The Applied Microbiology and Biotechnology is a peer-reviewed biweekly journal publishes papers and mini-reviews of new and emerging products, processes and technologies in the area of prokaryotic or eukaryotic cells, relevant enzymes and proteins; applied genetics and molecular biotechnology; genomics and proteomics; applied microbial and cell physiology; environmental biotechnology; process and products and more.

Abstracting and Indexing
The journal is abstracted and indexed in:

According to the Journal Citation Reports, the journal has a 2018 impact factor of 3.670.

References

English-language journals
Applied microbiology journals
Biotechnology journals